The 1967–68 Minnesota North Stars season was the team's inaugural season in the National Hockey League (NHL). They finished fourth in the West Division with a record of 27 wins, 32 losses, and 15 ties for 69 points. In the playoffs, they defeated the Los Angeles Kings in seven games in the Quarter-finals before losing to the St. Louis Blues in the Semi-finals, also in seven games.

Offseason
On March 11, 1965, NHL President Clarence Campbell announced that the league would expand to twelve teams from six through the creation of a new six-team division for the 1967–68 season. In response to Campbell's announcement, a partnership of nine men, led by Walter Bush and John Driscoll, was formed to seek a franchise for the Twin Cities area of Minnesota.  Their efforts were successful as the NHL awarded one of six expansion franchises to Minnesota on February 9, 1966.  In addition to Minnesota, the five other franchises were California (Oakland), Los Angeles, Philadelphia, Pittsburgh and St. Louis.  The "North Stars" name was announced on May 25, 1966, following a public contest.  The name is derived from the state's motto "L'Étoile du Nord", which is a French phrase meaning "The Star of the North".  Months after the naming of the team, ground was broken on October 3, 1966, for a new hockey arena in Bloomington, Minnesota.  The home of the North Stars, the Metropolitan Sports Center (or Met Center for short), was built in 12 months at a cost of US$7 million.  The arena was ready for play for the start of the 1967–68 NHL season, but portions of the arena's construction had not been completed. Spectator seats were in the process of being installed as fans arrived at the arena for the opening home game on October 21, 1967.

Regular season

Bill Masterton
On January 13, 1968, four minutes into a game against the Seals at the Met Center, North Stars center Bill Masterton was checked by Oakland's Larry Cahan and Ron Harris and fell backwards onto the ice head-first. The force of the back of his head hitting the ice damaged the pons and caused severe hemorrhaging, as blood gushed from his mouth and nose. Masterton was taken to hospital where he died two days later, becoming the only player ever to die as a result of an on-ice injury.

Final standings

Record vs. opponents

Schedule and results

Playoffs
The North Stars, having squeaked into the playoffs by two points (having the same amount of wins as Pittsburgh but with two more ties) would play the #2 seed in the newly-created Western Division side of the postseason bracket, since the expansion from six to twelve teams put all the new teams in the Western that would ensure one of them to play in the Stanley Cup. At any rate, Minnesota would play in five overtime games in their fourteen postseason matches, winning just two of them. The North Stars, facing the chance to go to the Stanley Cup, took the lead in Game 7 on Walt McKechnie's goal with 3:11 to play. However, the Blues followed it up 31 seconds later with a goal from Dickie Moore that would mean overtime. Cesare Maniago and Glenn Hall combined for 80 saves, but Ron Schock's "Midnight Goal" in double-overtime (it would be known as the "Midnight Goal" by numerous fans) to send the Blues to the Final.

Stanley Cup Quarterfinals

North Stars win series 4–3

Stanley Cup Semifinals

North Stars lose series 4–3

In the first round of the Western Division playoffs, the North Stars defeated the Los Angeles Kings in seven games. The second round of the playoff series would be played against the St. Louis Blues and that series would go to seven games as well. The Blues would win the seventh game and advance to face the Montreal Canadiens in the 1968 Stanley Cup Finals.

Player statistics

Forwards
Note: GP = Games played; G = Goals; A = Assists; Pts = Points; PIM = Penalty minutes

Defencemen
Note: GP = Games played; G = Goals; A = Assists; Pts = Points; PIM = Penalty minutes

Goaltending
Note: GP = Games played; W = Wins; L = Losses; T = Ties; SO = Shutouts; GAA = Goals against average

Awards and records

Transactions

Draft picks

Expansion draft

Amateur draft
Minnesota's draft picks at the 1967 NHL Amateur Draft held at the Queen Elizabeth Hotel in Montreal, Quebec.

Farm teams

See also
 1967–68 NHL season

References

External links
 North Stars on Hockey Database

 

Minnesota
Minnesota
Minnesota North Stars seasons
Minnesota North Stars
Minnesota North Stars